Diamond Donner was an early 20th-century theatre actor.

Personal life
From Boston, Diamond Donner was the daughter of Gustav Theodore and Louella Donner.  She was a 1901 alumnus of Wellesley College.  In August 1906, Donner had her mother committed to Ardendale Sanitarium in Cos Cob, Connecticut; when the older woman escaped on September 6 and was not recommitted, Donner traveled to Greenwich, Connecticut on September 10 to request adjudication on the matter.

Career
An aspiring stage actor since childhood, after graduating from Wellesley, she began her acting career as a chorus girl in The Prince of Pilsen.  According to The Minneapolis Journal, Donner looked so much like the famous actor Ethel Barrymore, she was frequently called the other woman's name.  In 1913, Donner's performance of Mimi in Carmen was described as one of the most significant triumphs of the season by the Daily Sentinel.

References

External links
 
 

20th-century American actresses
actresses from Boston
American musical theatre actresses
Wellesley College alumni
year of birth missing
year of death missing